Au Printemps (English: "In Spring") can refer to:

 Au Printemps (album), a 1958 album by Jacques Brel
 "Au printemps", a song on that album
 "Au printemps", an 1865 song by Charles Gounod, see List of compositions by Charles Gounod
 "Au printemps", an 1867 song by Léo Delibes, see List of compositions by Léo Delibes

See also
 Printemps (disambiguation)